The Commonwealth of Nations is a voluntary association of 56 sovereign states. Most of them were British colonies or dependencies of those colonies.

No government in the Commonwealth exercises power over the others, as is the case in a political union. Rather, the Commonwealth is an international organization in which countries with diverse social, political, and economic backgrounds are regarded as equal in status, and cooperate within a framework of common values and goals, as outlined in the Singapore Declaration issued in 1971. Such common values and goals include the promotion of democracy, human rights, good governance, the rule of law, civil liberties, equality before the law, free trade, multilateralism, and world peace, which are promoted through multilateral projects and meetings, such as the Commonwealth Games, held once every four years.

The symbol of this free association is King Charles III, who serves as the Head of the Commonwealth. This position, however, does not imbue him with any political or executive power over any Commonwealth member states; the position is purely symbolic, and it is the Commonwealth Secretary-General who is the chief executive of the Commonwealth.

The Commonwealth was first officially formed in 1926 when the Balfour Declaration of the Imperial Conference recognised the full sovereignty of dominions. Known as the "British Commonwealth", the original and therefore earliest members were the United Kingdom, Canada, Australia, New Zealand, South Africa, Irish Free State, and Newfoundland. It was re-stated by the 1930 conference and incorporated in the Statute of Westminster the following year (although Australia and New Zealand did not adopt the statute until 1942 and 1947 respectively). In 1949, the London Declaration marked the birth of the modern Commonwealth and the adoption of its present name. The members have a combined population of 2.4 billion, almost a third of the Earth's population, of whom 1.21 billion live in India, and 95% live in Asia and Africa combined. The most recent members to join were the Francophone African nations of Gabon and Togo on 29 June 2022, who along with Rwanda and Mozambique are unique in not having a historic constitutional relationship with the United Kingdom or other Commonwealth states.

Currently, fifteen of the member states are Commonwealth realms, with the Head of the Commonwealth as their heads of state, five others are monarchies with their own individual monarchs (Brunei, Eswatini, Lesotho, Malaysia and Tonga), and the rest are republics. The Republic of Ireland (as of 1949 according to the Commonwealth; 1936 according to the Irish government) and Zimbabwe (2003) are former members of the Commonwealth.

Current members 
All dates below are provided by the Commonwealth of Nations Secretariat members list, and population figures are as of 1 February 2020.

A. Unless otherwise noted, independence was gained from the United Kingdom on the date (shown in column 2) of joining the Commonwealth.
B. Not a member of the Commonwealth Foundation.
C. Though Pakistan celebrates 14 August 1947 as its independence day, independence was officially granted at midnight, 15 August 1947. Therefore, its date of joining the Commonwealth would be 15 August 1947.
D. Geographically a part of Asia, considered a European country in political geography.
E. Constitutional monarchy that operates under a Westminster system. The monarch is not the same individual as the British monarch, hence making it not a Commonwealth realm.
F. In geology, the Maltese Islands is located on the African Plate. The island group lies approx. 200 km south of the boundary between the African Plate and the Eurasian Plate. In political geography, Malta is considered a European country.

Former members

Dissolved members

Prospective members

G. The population figure is based on 2014 estimates.

Other candidates

Other states which have expressed an interest in joining the Commonwealth over the years or states which may be eligible to join the Commonwealth include: Bahrain, Cambodia, Egypt, the Republic of Ireland, Libya, Nepal, Sudan and Yemen.

See also
 Commonwealth of Nations membership criteria
 List of countries and territories where English is an official language
 List of countries by English-speaking population
 List of current viceregal representatives of the Crown

References

External links

 Commonwealth timeline
 
 
 

 
Members by date joined
History of the Commonwealth of Nations
Commonwealth of Nations